Kepler-46, previously designated KOI-872, is a star located in the constellation Lyra. Observed since 2009 by the Kepler space observatory, it has since been found to possess a planetary system consisting of at least three planets and while it has a similar mass to the Sun (90%) it is significantly older at ten billion years.

Kepler-46 b (previously KOI-872.01), was the first planet discovered in the system.  It was found through detailed analysis of Kepler space observatory data.  An additional planet, Kepler-46 c, was discovered by an outside group using Kepler public data through analysis of transit timing variations. While only one additional planet was confirmed by the analysis, the study revealed the potential existence of an unconfirmed planet KOI-872.03 (KOI-872 d). Validation by the multiplicity method confirmed the existence of this planet which was then renamed Kepler-46d.

Planetary system
Planet b is a gas giant planet with a mass slightly less than that of Jupiter. The second planet in the system was among the first to be discovered through the method of transit timing variations, and through its confirmation of KOI-872 c with a 99% confidence level has shown that the method of detection may be used to detect future extrasolar planets and, possibly, extrasolar moons. This second planet exerted a gravitational force on the first planet, orbiting its host star in just 34 days. While this usually occurs on an extremely regular schedule, additional planets within the system can disrupt the time of the transit, and these disruptions can indicate the presence of a planet, even if the disrupting planet does not pass in front of the host star itself.

The data show that Kepler-46 c is an approximately Saturn-mass object with an orbital period of 57 days. As the planet does not itself transit its host star, there is no way of knowing its size (probably a similar size to its sibling). The measurements also suggest the existence of another planet orbiting with a period of about 6.8 days, and this planet was confirmed in 2016.

The method in which the planet was detected is similar to the way that the planet Neptune was discovered, in which the newly discovered planet is detected by its pull on another which is already known to exist.

In 2021, it was found the orbital plane of Kepler-46b is slowly changing, likely under the gravitational influence of the additional giant planet.

References

Notes

Lyra (constellation)
Planetary systems with three confirmed planets
872
Planetary transit variables